4-dimethylallyltryptophan N-methyltransferase (fgaMT (gene), easF (gene)) is an enzyme with systematic name S-adenosyl-L-methionine:4-(3-methylbut-2-enyl)-L-tryptophan N-methyltransferase. This enzyme catalyses the following chemical reaction

 S-adenosyl-L-methionine + 4-dimethylallyl-L-tryptophan  S-adenosyl-L-homocysteine + 4-dimethylallyl-L-abrine

The enzyme catalyses a step in the pathway leading to biosynthesis of ergot alkaloids in certain fungi.

References

External links 
 

EC 2.1.1